The CZAW Parrot, also called the CSA Parrot, is a Czech light-sport aircraft that was designed and produced by Czech Aircraft Works, now Czech Sport Aircraft of Prague. The aircraft first flew on 15 June 2005 and, while it was available, it was supplied as a complete ready-to-fly-aircraft.

The Parrot was discontinued in May 2008, after three were completed and the design developed into the PS-10 Tourer.

Design and development
The Parrot was designed to comply with the US light-sport aircraft rules. It features a cantilever high-wing, a two-seats-in-side-by-side configuration enclosed cockpit, fixed tricycle landing gear with wheel pants and a single engine in tractor configuration.

The Parrot is made from aluminum sheet. The forward sweep allows the cabin to be forward of the wing, providing pilot visibility in turns. Standard engines available were the  Rotax 912ULS and the  Jabiru 3300 four-stroke powerplants.

The Parrot was first flown on 15 June 2005 and the prototype was immediately shipped to the United States to be displayed at AirVenture 2005. The design was added to the Federal Aviation Administration's list of approved special light-sport aircraft in January 2006. By May 2008 three Parrots had been completed and the aircraft was discontinued.

The design was included in the intellectual property transferred from CZAW to CSA in 2009 and then redesigned with components from the PS-28 Cruiser and designated as the PS-10 Tourer. The PS-10 Tourer first flew on 6 December 2010 and was first publicly shown at the Aero show in Friedrichshafen in 2011. By December 2012 the PS-10 was not yet advertised for sale by CSA.

Variants
Parrot
First flown 15 June 2005, discontinued May 2008 after three built.
PS-10 Tourer
Developmental evolution of the Parrot to include common engine cowling, nose gear and rudder assemblies with the PS-28 Cruiser, plus the addition of rear windows, larger elevator trim tab, removal of rudder horn and the empty weight was reduced. First flown 6 December 2010.

Specifications (Parrot)

References

Homebuilt aircraft
Light-sport aircraft
Parrot
Single-engined tractor aircraft
High-wing aircraft
Aircraft first flown in 2005
Forward-swept-wing aircraft
2000s Czech sport aircraft